The following is a list of current Catholic religious institutes. Most are Latin Catholic; however, Eastern Catholic institutes are also included.

The list given here includes not only examples of pontifical-right institutes but also some that are only of diocesan right. It includes even some associations formed with a view to becoming religious institutes but not yet canonically erected even on the diocesan level.

The list does not distinguish between institutes that historically would be classified either as "orders" or as "congregations".

Institutes are listed alphabetically by their common names, not their official ones. For example, the Jesuits, officially called the Society of Jesus, would be listed under 'J' rather than under 'S.' If an institute's official name is used more often than a nickname, it will be listed as such.

List

See also

 List of defunct Catholic religious institutes

References

External links
Catholic Hierarchy
Vocation Network
Vatican Internet Sites

 

Religious institutes
Religious institutes